Chittajallu (also spelled as Chittajalu) is one of the Indian family names.

 Chittajallu Pullaiah, famous Telugu film director.
 Chittajallu Srinivasa Rao, famous Telugu film director.